|}

The Greatwood Hurdle is a Grade 3 National Hunt hurdle race in Great Britain which is open to horses aged four years or older. It is run on the Old Course at Cheltenham over a distance of about 2 miles and half a furlong (2 miles and 87 yards, or 3,298 metres), and during its running there are eight hurdles to be jumped. It is a handicap race, and it is scheduled to take place each year in November.

The event has been run under various titles, and for a period it was classed at Listed level. It was sponsored on behalf of Greatwood, a charity for the welfare of retired racehorses, from 2003 to 2011. It was run as the Racing Post Hurdle when the Racing Post began sponsored the race in 2012 and from 2013 the sponsorship was taken over by the Stan James bookmaking firm and the name of Greatwood returned to the race title. It attained Grade 3 status in 2004. Unibet became the race's title sponsor in 2017 after purchasing the Stan James business.

Winners since 1987
 Weights given in stones and pounds.

See also
 Horse racing in Great Britain
 List of British National Hunt races

References

 Racing Post:
 pedigreequery.com – Greatwood Hurdle – Cheltenham.
  – Greatwood website.

National Hunt races in Great Britain
Cheltenham Racecourse
National Hunt hurdle races